Macharomancy (Greek makhaira, a short sword or a dagger, and manteia, prophecy; alternative spellings are machæromancy, machairomancy) is a form of divination by interpreting knives, daggers or swords, one of many methods of divination based on the use of weapons (cf belomancy – by arrows, axinomancy – by axes, and other).

See also 
 Athame
 Boline
 Magic sword
 Methods of divination

References 
 Divination Glossary Edivination
 Divinations Online

Divination
Blade weapons